Pendleton County is a county located in the U.S. state of West Virginia. As of the 2020 census, the population was 6,143, making it the second-least populous county in West Virginia.  Its county seat is Franklin. The county was created by the Virginia General Assembly in 1788 from parts of Augusta, Hardy, and Rockingham Counties and was named for Edmund Pendleton (1721–1803), a distinguished Virginia statesman and jurist. Pendleton County was strongly pro-Confederate during the American Civil War; however, there were pockets of Unionists who supported the state government in Wheeling.

Spruce Knob, located in Pendleton County, is the highest point in the state and in the Alleghenies, its elevation being 4,863 feet. Parts of the Monongahela and George Washington National Forests are also located in Pendleton.

History
By the 1740s, the three main valleys of what became Pendleton County had been visited and named by white hunters and prospectors. One of the hunters, a single man named Abraham Burner, built himself a log cabin about a half mile downstream of the future site of Brandywine in 1745. He was the county's first white settler. A local historian recorded that: The site ... [was] on the left bank of the river, and near the beginning of a long, eastward bend. From almost at his very door his huntsman's eye was at times gladdened by seeing perhaps fifty deer either drinking from the steam or plunging in their heads up to their ears in search of moss. By 1747, immigrants were impinging on the (future) borders of Pendleton from two directions: the larger community was mostly Germans moving up the valley of the South Branch Potomac; the lesser consisted mainly of Scotch-Irish moving northwest from Staunton up into the headwaters of the James River. In an April 1758 surprise raid of Fort Seybert and nearby Fort Upper Tract occasioned by the French and Indian War (1754–63), most of the 60 white settlers sheltering there were massacred by Shawnee and Delaware warriors and the forts were burned.

Pendleton County was created by the Virginia General Assembly in 1788 from parts of Augusta, Hardy, and Rockingham Counties and was named for Edmund Pendleton, a distinguished Virginia statesman and jurist. Pendleton County was split between Northern and Southern sympathies during the American Civil War. The northern section of the county, including the enclave in the Smoke Hole community was staunchly Unionist. In June 1863, the county was included by the federal government in the new state of West Virginia against the wishes of many of the inhabitants. That fall, Union General W.W. Averell swept up the South Branch valley, and destroyed the Confederate saltpetre works above Franklin.

In the months following the state's establishment, West Virginia's counties were divided into civil townships, with the intention of encouraging local government.  This proved impractical in the heavily rural state, and in 1872 the townships were converted into magisterial districts.  Pendleton County was divided into six districts: Bethel, Circleville, Franklin, Mill Run, Sugar Grove, and Union.  Except for minor adjustments, these magisterial districts remained largely unchanged until the 1990s, when they were consolidated into three new districts: Central, Eastern, and Western.

Pendleton County and the surrounding area were hit by severe flooding in November 1985.  At Franklin, the county seat, the South Branch of the Potomac crested at 22.6 feet, more than fifteen feet above flood stage in the shallow riverbed.  Sixty-two people were killed in West Virginia, Virginia, Maryland, and Pennsylvania, in what became known as the "1985 Election Day floods" in Virginia, or the "Killer Floods of 1985" in West Virginia.  According to the National Weather Service, thirty-eight of the deaths occurred in Pendleton and Grant Counties, West Virginia.  Twenty-two people were killed in Virginia, and there was one fatality each attributed to the flooding in Maryland and Pennsylvania.

Geography

It is the fifth-largest county in West Virginia by area.

Major highways

Adjacent counties
Grant County (north)
Hardy County (northeast)
Rockingham County, Virginia (east)
Augusta County, Virginia (south)
Highland County, Virginia (south)
Pocahontas County (southwest)
Randolph County (west)

National protected areas
George Washington National Forest (part)
Monongahela National Forest (part)
Spruce Knob–Seneca Rocks National Recreation Area (part)
United States National Radio Quiet Zone (part)

National Natural Landmarks
Germany Valley Karst Area
Sinnett-Thorn Mountain Cave System

Economy
Pendleton County's economy consists mainly of small to medium-sized farms and small businesses. Most of these are in Franklin, the county's only incorporated town. The North Fork Valley, on the western side of the county, has a number of businesses that cater to tourists who come for the area's outdoor recreation opportunities. These include motels, restaurants, and guide services. In recent years, maple syrup has emerged as a major growth industry in the county. Dry Fork Maple Works, the state's largest maple sugaring operation, is based in Pendleton County (though its sugaring operation occurs mainly in neighboring Randolph County).

The county is also home to a number of non-profits whose reaches extend well beyond the county lines. These include Almost Heaven Habitat for Humanity, Future Generations and Future Generations Graduate School, The Mountain Institute, and Mountain Springs Farm and Heritage Center.

Sugar Grove Station, an electronic listening post for the National Security Agency, is located near the southeast corner of the Pendleton County.

Demographics

2000 census
As of the census of 2000, there were 8,196 people, 3,350 households, and 2,355 families residing in the county.  The population density was 12 people per square mile (5/km2).  There were 5,102 housing units at an average density of 7 per square mile (3/km2).  The racial makeup of the county was 96.34% White, 2.12% Black or African American, 0.27% Native American, 0.18% Asian, 0.04% Pacific Islander, 0.28% from other races, and 0.77% from two or more races.   0.89% of the population were Hispanic or Latino of any race.

There were 3,350 households, out of which 28.00% had children under the age of 18 living with them, 57.40% were married couples living together, 8.10% had a female householder with no husband present, and 29.70% were non-families. 25.80% of all households were made up of individuals, and 12.20% had someone living alone who was 65 years of age or older.  The average household size was 2.40 and the average family size was 2.87.

In the county, the population was spread out, with 21.80% under the age of 18, 7.30% from 18 to 24, 27.00% from 25 to 44, 26.10% from 45 to 64, and 17.80% who were 65 years of age or older.  The median age was 41 years. For every 100 females there were 101.30 males.  For every 100 females age 18 and over, there were 101.50 males.

The median income for a household in the county was $30,429, and the median income for a family was $34,860. Males had a median income of $25,342 versus $16,753 for females. The per capita income for the county was $15,805.  About 8.00% of families and 11.40% of the population were below the poverty line, including 13.60% of those under age 18 and 12.50% of those age 65 or over.

2010 census
As of the 2010 United States census, there were 7,695 people, 3,285 households, and 2,179 families residing in the county. The racial makeup of the county was 96.2% white, 1.9% black or African American, 0.3% Asian, 0.2% American Indian, 0.2% from other races, and 1.2% from two or more races. Those of Hispanic or Latino origin made up 0.9% of the population. In terms of ancestry, 30.1% were German, 8.1% were American, 7.3% were Irish, and 6.4% were English.

Of the 3,285 households, 24.8% had children under the age of 18 living with them, 54.6% were married couples living together, 7.1% had a female householder with no husband present, 33.7% were non-families, and 29.0% of all households were made up of individuals. The average household size was 2.28 and the average family size was 2.80. The median age was 47.3 years.

The median income for a household in the county was $33,323 and the median income for a family was $49,613. Males had a median income of $38,190 versus $23,243 for females. The per capita income for the county was $19,401. About 11.0% of families and 15.1% of the population were below the poverty line, including 17.3% of those under age 18 and 22.2% of those age 65 or over.

Politics

Communities

Towns
Franklin (county seat)

Magisterial districts

Current
Central
Eastern
Western

Historic
Bethel
Circleville
Franklin
Mill Run
Sugar Grove
Union

Census-designated place
Brandywine

Unincorporated communities

Big Run
Brushy Run
Cave
Cherry Grove
Circleville
Dahmer
Deer Run
Dry Run
Entry
Fame
Fort Seybert
Harper
Judy Gap
Ketterman
Kline
Macksville
Miles
Mitchell
Moatstown
Monkeytown
Moyers
Mozer
Oak Flat
Oak Grove
Onego
Propstburg
Riverton
Ruddle
Seneca Rocks
Simoda
Sugar Grove
Teterton
Upper Tract
Zigler

Historic Places

The following sites are listed on the National Register of Historic Places.

Gallery

See also
National Register of Historic Places listings in Pendleton County, West Virginia
Pendleton County Schools
Thorn Creek Wildlife Management Area

Footnotes

References

External links

Guide to Pendleton County
Pendleton County Chamber of Commerce
Pendleton County Economic & Community Development Authority
Pendleton County Schools
Visit Pendleton County

 
1788 establishments in Virginia
Populated places established in 1788
West Virginia counties on the Potomac River
Counties of Appalachia